Rex Montague Maddaford (born 9 March 1947) is a New Zealand long-distance runner. He competed in the men's 5000 metres at the 1968 Summer Olympics.

Maddaford ran collegiately for Eastern New Mexico University in Portales, New Mexico, winning the 1970 NAIA Men's Cross Country Championship individual title, among other accomplishments. Maddaford was inducted into the Eastern New Mexico University Hall of Fame in 1984.

References

1947 births
Living people
Athletes (track and field) at the 1968 Summer Olympics
New Zealand male long-distance runners
Olympic athletes of New Zealand
Place of birth missing (living people)
Eastern New Mexico University alumni